W. Henry Lewis House is a national historic site located at 424 North Oak Street, Fort Meade, Florida in Polk County. It is a two-story wooden Queen Anne style home, built in 1901.

It was added to the National Register of Historic Places on September 19, 2012.

References

National Register of Historic Places in Polk County, Florida
Fort Meade, Florida
1901 establishments in Florida
Houses completed in 1901